Auxiliary constables or reserve constables (reserve constable has a different definition in British Columbia) are unpaid citizens in Canada who volunteer their time and skills to a police force. They are uniformed, unarmed members who perform a similar role to their UK counterparts in the Special Constabulary. Their main function is to supplement the police force with additional manpower, with duties varying by appointment, geographical location and the needs of the specific detachment/department.

Durham Regional Police Auxiliary Unit 

Durham Regional Police (DRP) Auxiliary unit was created in 1977 and provide additional resources to the force. Auxiliary members are involved in community-based initiatives and may be paired with regular officers on patrol. There are 50 members in the unit with 38 as frontline officers.

Unlike front line officers, auxiliary members wear a light blue shirt and cap has a red and black Battenburg markings instead of solid red. Auxiliary constables are unarmed.

Halton Regional Police Service Auxiliary Unit
The Halton Regional Police Service (HRPS) Auxiliary unit was founded in 1989, and is composed of 60 trained civilian volunteers.

HRPS Auxiliary officers support the regular service as follows:

 Crime Prevention initiatives
 Crowd Control
 Traffic Control
 Car and foot patrol with regular service members
 Bike Unit
 Emergency and Disaster Response
 RIDE initiatives
 Child safety seat clinics

Unlike front line officers, auxiliary members wear a light blue shirt and cap has a red and black Battenburg markings instead of solid red. Auxiliary constables are unarmed.

Niagara Regional Police Service Auxiliary Unit

Niagara Regional Police Service has a 75-member auxiliary unit.

Unlike front line officers, auxiliary members wear caps with a red and black Battenburg markings, instead of solid red. Auxiliary constables are unarmed.

Ontario Provincial Police Auxiliary program 
The Ontario Provincial Police Auxiliary program follows a mission statement: "To provide fully trained volunteer Auxiliary Members to perform police duties in special circumstances, including emergencies, when there are not sufficient O.P.P. police officers.". The O.P.P. auxiliary is a volunteer program where selected citizens receive special training in order to perform many duties such as community policing initiatives and projects, regular patrol, crime and disaster scenes, large gatherings or parades for crowd and traffic control, and traffic control at accidents. The Ontario Provincial Police auxiliary program is the only such Canadian program that requires its auxiliary constables to attend a full-time recruit course conducted near its regular training facility in Orillia,.  This is followed by ongoing in-service training at the detachments.  The program may also serve as a stepping stone for potential future employment.

The O.P.P. Auxiliary has an authorised strength of over 900 auxiliary constables and is the largest police auxiliary unit in Ontario.

It is recognized that the O.P.P. Auxiliary Constables shall not be utilized to replace regular members in any duties.  Training must occur for auxiliary personnel to a level to provide necessary skills to safely fulfill the requirements of their mandate under the Police Services Act, and that they participate within those duties which enhance community policing efforts, crime prevention programs, and public service as opposed to direct police service delivery.

The Ontario Police Services Act does, however, provide for instances when the Auxiliary Member may have the authority of a Police Officer. This can occur in an emergency situation where the O.P.P. requires additional strength to cope with a special occasion or event.  To insure proficiency, O.P.P. auxiliary constables are required to conduct monthly patrol duties with regular constables.  O.P.P. auxiliary constables are not authorised to carry side arms during normal operations, but may be equipped with a long gun when patrolling with a regular member.  All O.P.P. auxiliary constables receive annual training with both side arms and long guns.

History of the O.P.P. Auxiliary 
The O.P.P. Auxiliary was originally formed in 1960 by an Order-in-Council when the program absorbed the Emergency Measures Organization who were trained in crowd control and first aid. The Program was managed by the O.P.P. and its members in the early years helped at community events and patrolled with regular O.P.P. members. Following an audit in 1988 a number of recommendations were made and in 1991 they became self-directed and the Commissioner appointed Auxiliary Chief Superintendent Terry Harkins as its executive director; Provincial Commander of the O.P.P. Auxiliary.

The volunteer component developed and included ranks, positions, promotional processes that mirrored the regular O.P.P. structure.

In the new organization, the Auxiliary took on the responsibility for standardized selection process and training of its members. The Auxiliary O.P.P. uniform differs only in the light blue shirt they wear as opposed to the dark blue shirt worn by regular O.P.P. members and all components of their outwear bear insignia identifying them as "Auxiliary/Auxiliare".  
In 1997 GATB (General Aptitude Test Battery) and Psychological Testing of new auxiliary recruits commenced.

Members of the auxiliary are "unpaid" and receive some compensation for travel and meals. 
Enrollment requirements are: Canadian citizen or permanent resident of Canada, minimum age of 18 years, Ontario Secondary School Graduation diploma or equivalent, have "standard" First Aid, mentally and physically able to perform duties of auxiliary member, possess a valid drivers license, good driving records and successfully complete the interview process.

Duties 
 Traffic control
 Ground security at major events
 Doing surveys
 Seat belt clinics
 Assisting on RIDE initiatives
 Bicycle inspections and rodeos
 Assisting at safety displays and presentations
 Foot and road patrols with regular members
 Accompanying regular members on marine and snow vehicle patrol
 Victim assistance
 Tagging evidence
 Ceremonial duties
 Search and rescue

Area of Responsibility
The OPP Auxiliaries operate in the following areas:

 Central Region
 Northeast Region
 Northwest Region
 Western Region
 Eastern Region
 Highway Safety Division

Ottawa Police Service Auxiliary Unit 
Ottawa Police Service's Auxiliary Unit was established on September 11, 2008.  Their main duty is community policing.

Other duties include:

 Crime Prevention Through Environmental Design (CPTED) audits
 Marine Patrol
 Child Car Seat Clinics
 Ride Alongs
 Assisting in Special Events
 Crime Prevention Initiatives

Unlike front line officers, auxiliary members wear a light blue shirt and cap has a red and black Battenburg markings instead of solid red. Auxiliary constables are unarmed.

Peel Regional Police Auxiliary 
The Peel Regional Police Auxiliary program has 100 officers made up of unarmed volunteers and was formed in 1989.

They support regular Peel officers with:

 patrol and marine escorts
 R.I.D.E, program assistance
 special events
 emergency callout
 Auxiliary Honour Guard
 colours at Annual Unit Inspection

Unlike front line officers, auxiliary members wear a light blue shirt and cap has a red and black Battenburg markings instead of solid red. Auxiliary constables are unarmed.

Royal Canadian Mounted Police Auxiliary
The Royal Canadian Mounted Police (RCMP) started its Auxiliary programme in 1963 to assist the police during emergencies. The program was created under the Emergency Measures Act, but as time went by, the program evolved into its present-day status: complementing the RCMP in general operations. Auxiliary Constables work in Federal/national (RCMP), Provincial and Municipal Police Forces.

Auxiliary constables were allowed to be armed, but the policy changed in 1989 when they were told to surrender their issued weapons.

RCMP Auxiliary Constables History 

 RCMP first introduced the program to the provinces in 1963.
 Restricted to provinces/territories which have policing contracts with the RCMP and have provincial legislation providing for the appointment of auxiliaries.
 Active auxiliary programs are currently in place in all provinces except Ontario and Quebec, which have their own provincial police forces and do not require RCMP. The only exception is the National Capital Region (Ottawa-Gatineau) which is under federal, not provincial, control.

Approximately 2,400 auxiliary members, divided among the different provincial auxiliary programs are currently serving with the RCMP.
General policy guidelines are issued from Headquarters. Divisions, in co-operation with the provincial governments, are responsible for organising and administering the program within these guidelines.
All costs associated with the program are the responsibility of the provincial government.
Uniforms are supplied by the RCMP and costs charged back to the provinces.

Current Status 
 Auxiliary members are unpaid volunteers and since they are not employees of the RCMP, they are not entitled to the normal benefits and privileges of regular members.
 Applicants for the RCMP auxiliary constable program are identified in the communities.
 Applicants who volunteer must meet basic requirements.
 Applicants must achieve and maintain a security clearance
 Applicants must volunteer 160 hours annually
 Auxiliary members wear a uniform with shoulder badges showing the word "Auxiliary/Auxiliaire" as well as on their jackets and ballistic vest
 Auxiliaries are not currently authorized to accompany regular members on patrol but can perform other police functions under supervision, such as office duties, special events, property checks and traffic and crowd control. Additionally, they often assist regular members during peacetime emergencies and searches for lost persons.
 Participants will be covered by insurance against injury and civil liability and will have completed the approved RCMP training program for auxiliary constables.

Duties 
Duties differs between each detachment, but in general, they perform the following tasks:

 ATV Patrols
 Bike Patrols
 Coastal Watch
 Community Police Station /Office/Detachment activities
 Community Policing/ Crime Prevention Display
 Community/ Special Events
 Fingerprinting Children
 Neighbourhood Watch
 Personal Safety Lectures and demonstrations
 Safety talk and activities, such as safety audits
 Traffic Control

Auxiliary members wear the same light grey shirt, and their cap has blue band instead of yellow. Auxiliary constables are unarmed.

Toronto Police Service Auxiliary 

Toronto Police Service Auxiliary members support the regular service in the delivery of community-based crime prevention initiatives and ground searches for lost or missing persons. Members can also be seen volunteering at community events such as parades and fairs and assisting in car and foot patrols. Established in 1957, there are currently 340 auxiliary officers on the force.

 Emergency and Disaster Response
 Community-Based Policing
 Crime Prevention Initiatives
 Traffic Control
 General Patrol
 Crowd Control
 Missing Persons Searches
 Display at Major Malls and Parades

Unlike front line officers, auxiliary members wear a light blue shirt, and their cap has red and black Battenburg markings, instead of solid red. Auxiliary constables are unarmed.

Victoria Police Department Reserve Officers Program 
Victoria Police Department Reserve officers are volunteers whom assist regular officers and the force with:

 crime prevention program
 traffic and special events duties
 regular patrol with regular officers

Winnipeg Police Service Auxiliary Cadet 

Winnipeg Police Service (WPS) auxiliary service auxiliary cadets are civilian constables in uniform providing additional resources for regular sworn members.

York Regional Police Auxiliary 
120 York Regional Police Auxiliary members support the regular service in the delivery of community-based crime prevention initiatives and ground searches for lost or missing persons. Members can also be seen volunteering at community events such as parades and fairs and assisting in car and foot patrols.

 Emergency and Disaster Response
 Community-Based Policing
 Crime Prevention Initiatives
 Traffic Control
 General Patrol
 Crowd Control
 Missing Persons Searches

Similar to front line officers, auxiliary members wear a similar dark blue shirt but with an "Auxiliary" shoulder patch and a forge cap but with red and black Sillitoe tartan instead of solid red. Auxiliary constables are unarmed.

Cobourg Police Service Auxiliary Unit 

The Cobourg Police Service (CPS) Auxiliary unit is composed of 13 trained civilian volunteers. CPS Auxiliary officers support the regular service as follows:

 Crime Prevention initiatives
 Assisting in Special Events
 Emergency callouts (missing children, missing elderly, canvassing)
 Crowd Control and traffic control
 Car, Foot, Bike and Segway patrols, both general patrol and directed patrol
 Emergency and Disaster Response
 RIDE initiatives
 St John Ambulance First Aid Instruction of all service members
 Segway training of all service members
 Child safety seat clinics
 CPTED Audits, both residential and commercial

CPS Auxiliary members wear a light blue shirt and forage cap (ball cap in the summer) that includes Auxiliary patches identifying Auxiliary members. They are trained in Use of Force, including firearms familiarization. They also carry naloxone to assist the public in the event of opiate overdose. Auxiliary officers currently DO NOT carry firearms but are trained in their use, but do carry Expandable Batons and Handcuffs.

See also 
 Special constable
 Special police
 Auxiliary police

References 

Law enforcement in Canada
Auxiliary police units